Boualem Mankour (born 21 September 1970) is a French-Algerian football manager.

He coached FC Saint-Éloi Lupopo from 2007 to 2011, managing a second place in 2010 Linafoot. In 2014, he was coach of FC Seichamps.
He was appointed as manager of the Mauritius national football team in February 2020.

References 

1970 births
Living people
French sportspeople of Algerian descent
French football managers
French expatriate football managers
Expatriate football managers in the Democratic Republic of the Congo
French expatriate sportspeople in the Democratic Republic of the Congo
Linafoot managers
Mauritius national football team managers